Ramswaroop Kasana is an Indian politician from the Rashatriya loktantrik party. He was a Member of Legislative Assembly (MLA) in Rajasthan Legislative Assembly from 2008 to 2013 and was the Parliamentary Secretary in the Government of Rajasthan.

References 

Rajasthani politicians
Living people
Politicians from Jaipur
Rajasthan MLAs 2008–2013